The Prey Lang forest skink (Sphenomorphus preylangensis) is a species of skink found in Cambodia.

References

preylangensis
Reptiles described in 2019
Reptiles of Cambodia